This was the ninth edition of Los Premios 40 Principales, the annual awards organized by Spanish music radio Los 40 Principales. It was held on December 12, 2014 in Madrid's Barclaycard Center (formerly known as Palacio de los Deportes), which has been home to the award show since its creation in 2006.

Performers

Awards
The following is the list of all winners and nominees from the 2014 edition:

Best Spanish Act
Leiva
Antonio Orozco
David Bisbal
Enrique Iglesias
Malú

Best Spanish New Act
Dvicio
Mr. Kilombo
Sweet California
Lucy Paradise
María Sagana

Best Spanish Video
Maldita Nerea - Mira dentro
Dani Martín - Emocional
Enrique Iglesias - Bailando
Dvicio - Paraíso
Auryn - Puppeteer

Best Festival, Tour or Concert in Spain
David Bisbal - Gira Tú y Yo
Malú - Tour Sí
Dani Martín - Gira Cero 2014
Antonio Orozco - Gira Ozean's Club
One Direction - Where We Are World Tour

Best Spanish Album
David Bisbal - Tú y yo
Enrique Iglesias - Sex + Love
Leiva - Pólvora
Malú - Sí
Antonio Orozco - Dos orillas

Best Spanish Song
Enrique Iglesias - Bailando
Leiva - Terriblemente cruel
David Bisbal - Diez mil maneras
Antonio Orozco - Llegará
Malú - A prueba de ti

Best International Act
Coldplay
Jason Derülo
Pharrell Williams
One Direction
OneRepublic

Best International Album
Ed Sheeran - "X"
One Direction - "Midnight Memories"
Katy Perry - "Prism"
Birdy - "Fire Within"
Jason Derülo - "Tattoos"

Best International Song
Jason Derülo - "Talk Dirty"
Pharrell Williams - "Happy"
Miley Cyrus - "Wrecking Ball"
Avicii - "Hey Brother"
OneRepublic - "Counting Stars"

Best International New Act
Milky Chance
The Vamps
Ariana Grande
Lorde
Birdy

Best Latin Act
Shakira
Pitbull
Jennifer Lopez
Ricky Martin
Wisin

Best International Video
Pharrell Williams - "Happy"
Miley Cyrus - "Wrecking Ball"
Jason Derülo - "Wiggle"
One Direction - "Story of My Life"
Katy Perry - "Dark Horse"

Honorable Mentions
Best international tour by a Spanish act: David Bisbal
Best Spanish rock act: Leiva

Los Premios 40 Principales América 2014
The second edition of Los Premios 40 Principales América was held on November 13, 2014 in Buenos Aires, Argentina. The following is the list of nominees and winners:

Best Mexican Act
Camila
Zoé
Molotov
Café Tacuba
Jenny and the Mexicats

Best Colombian Act
Piso 21
Carlos Vives
Naela
Maluma
Alkilados

Best Argentine Act
Tan Biónica
Axel
Miranda!
Abel Pintos
Banda de Turistas

Best Chilean Act
Francisca Valenzuela
Gondwana
Gepe
Ana Tijoux
Javiera Mena

Best Panamanian Act
Comando Tiburón
Nigga
Martin Machore
Joey Montana
I-Nesta

Best Costa Rican Act
Los Ajenos
Cocofunka
Percance
Ojo de Buey
Por Partes

Best Ecuadorian Act
David Cañizares
Maykel
Daniel Betancourth
Nikki Macliff
Daniel Páez

Best Guatemalan Act
Pedro Cuevas
Flaminia
Tijuana Love
Piva
Ale Mendoza

Best Paraguayan Act
Kchiporros
Iván Zavala
Paiko
Humbertiko & Urbanos
Salamandra

Best Dominican Act
Vicente García
Romeo Santos
Prince Royce
Los Ilegales
Aura

Best Spanish Language Act
Enrique Iglesias
Juanes
Alejandro Sanz
Daddy Yankee
Romeo Santos

Best Spanish Language Album
Enrique Iglesias - Sex + Love
Carlos Vives - Corazón profundo
Shakira - Shakira
Prince Royce - Soy el mismo
Romeo Santos - Formula vol. 2

Best Spanish Language Song
Enrique Iglesias ft. Descemer Bueno & Gente de Zona - "Bailando"
J Balvin ft. Farruko - "6 AM"
Wisin ft. Jennifer Lopez & Ricky Martin - "Adrenalina"
Prince Royce - "Darte un beso"
Jesse & Joy - "Llorar"

Best English Language Act
One Direction
Daft Punk
Bruno Mars
Calvin Harris
Katy Perry

Best English Language Song
Daft Punk ft. Pharrell Williams - "Get Lucky"
Pharrell Williams - "Happy"
Robin Thicke ft. T.I. & Pharrell Williams - "Blurred Lines"
Clean Bandit ft. Jess Glynne - "Rather Be"
Calvin Harris - "Summer"

Special Awards
Most International Spanish-Language Act: David Bisbal
Special Jury Award: Train

References

2014 music awards
Los Premios 40 Principales
2014 in Spanish music